is a passenger railway station of the West Japan Railway Company (JR-West) located in the city of Kameyama, Mie, Japan.

Lines
Kabuto Station is served by the Kansai Main Line, and is located 71.1 rail kilometres from the terminus of the line at Nagoya Station and 11.1 rail kilometres from Kameyama Station.

Layout
The station consists of a side platform and a converted side platform serving two tracks, connected by a footbridge.

Platforms

History
Kabuto Station was opened on September 21, 1896, with the extension of the Kansai Railway from Yokkaichi Station to Tsuge Station. The Kansai Railway was nationalized on October 1, 1907, becoming part of the Imperial Government Railways (IGR), which became Japan National Railways (JNR) after World War II. Freight operations were discontinued from October 1, 1962. With the privatization of JNR on April 1, 1987, the station came under the control of JR-West.

Passenger statistics
In fiscal 2019, the station was used by an average of 48 passengers daily (boarding passengers only).

Surrounding area
Shinpuku-ji
Kabuto River

See also
 List of railway stations in Japan

References

External links

  

Railway stations in Japan opened in 1896
Railway stations in Mie Prefecture
Kameyama, Mie